Class 71 may refer to:
GMB Class 71, a Norwegian passenger train.
 British Rail Class 71
 DRG Class 71, a class of German tank locomotives with a 2-4-2T wheel arrangement operated by the Deutsche Reichsbahn comprising the:
 DRG Class 71.0: Standard locomotive Einheitslokomotive
 Class 71.0: Prussian T 5.1
 Class 71.2: Bavarian Pt 2/4 H
 Class 71.3: Saxon IV T
 Class 71.4: Oldenburg T 5.1
 Class 71.5: BBÖ DT 1
 Class 71.6: PH E
 Class 71.70: PKP Class OKe1